A rain sensor or rain switch is a switching device activated 
by rainfall. There are two main applications for rain sensors. The first is a water conservation device connected to an automatic irrigation system that causes the system to shut down in the event of rainfall. The second is a device used to protect the interior of an automobile from rain and to support the automatic mode of 
windscreen wipers.

How Does a Rain Sensor Work? 

Operation

The rain sensor works on the principle of total internal reflection. ... An infrared light beams at a 45-degree angle on a clear area of the windshield is reflected and it is sensed by thesensor-inside the car. When it rains, the wet glass causes the light to scatter and lesser amount of light gets reflected back to the sensor

An additional application in professional satellite communications antennas is to trigger a rain blower on the aperture of the antenna feed, to remove water droplets from the mylar cover that keeps pressurized and dry air inside the wave-guides.

Irrigation sensors
Rain sensors for irrigation systems are available in both wireless and 
hard-wired versions, most employing hygroscopic disks that swell in the 
presence of rain and shrink back down again as they dry out — an 
electrical switch is in turn depressed or released by the hygroscopic 
disk stack, and the rate of drying is typically adjusted by controlling 
the ventilation reaching the stack. However, some electrical type 
sensors are also marketed that use tipping bucket or conductance type 
probes to measure rainfall. Wireless and wired versions both use similar
mechanisms to temporarily suspend watering by the irrigation controller
— specifically they are connected to the irrigation controller's sensor
terminals, or are installed in series with the solenoid valve common 
circuit such that they prevent the opening of any valves when rain has 
been sensed.

Some irrigation rain sensors also contain a freeze sensor to keep the system from operating in freezing temperatures, particularly where irrigation systems are still used over the winter.

Some type of sensor is required on new lawn sprinkler systems in Florida, New Jersey, Minnesota, Connecticut and most parts of Texas.

Automotive sensors

In 1958, the Cadillac Motor Car Division of General Motors experimented with a water-sensitive switch that triggered various electric motors to close the convertible top and raise the open windows of a specially-built Eldorado Biarritz model, in case of rain. The first such device appears to have been used for that same purpose in a concept vehicle designated Le Sabre and built around 1950–51.

General Motors' automatic rain sensor for convertible tops was available as a dealer-installed option during the 1950s for vehicles such as the Chevrolet Bel Air.

For the 1996 Model Year, Cadillac once again equipped cars with an automatic rain sensor; this time to automatically trigger the windshield wipers and adjust their speed to conditions as necessary.

In December 2017 Tesla started rolling out an OTA update (2017.52.3) enabling their AP2.x cars to utilize the onboard cameras to passively detect rain without the use of a dedicated sensor.

Most vehicles with this feature have an "AUTO" position on the control column.

Physics of rain sensor

The most common modern rain sensors are based on the principle of total internal reflection. At all times, an infrared light is beamed at a 45-degree angle into the windshield from the interior. If the glass is dry, the critical angle for total internal refraction is around 42°. This value is obtained with the total internal refraction formula

In that case, since the incident angle of light is 45°, all the light is reflected and the detector receives maximum intensity.

If the glass is wet, the critical angle changes to around 60° because the refraction index of water is higher than air. In that case, because the incident angle is 45°, total internal reflection is not obtained. Part of the light beam is transmitted through the glass and the intensity measured for reflection is lower : the system detects water and the wipers turn on.

See also
 List of sensors
 Rain gauge

References

Irrigation
Sensors
Meteorological instrumentation and equipment
Windscreen wiper